Clubul Sportiv Municipal Vaslui, commonly known as CSM Vaslui, is a men's handball team from Vaslui, Romania. The club was founded in 1974 and promoted back in the Liga Națională in 2014, after 15 years of absence.

The club plays its home matches in Sala Sporturilor from Vaslui, a sports hall with a capacity of 1,500 people.

Kits

Honours
Divizia A:
Winners  (2): 2014, 2019

References

External links
  

 
Romanian handball clubs
Sport in Vaslui
Handball clubs established in 1974
1974 establishments in Romania
Liga Națională (men's handball)
Divizia A (men's handball)